The Western Canary Islands goldcrest, Regulus regulus ellenthalerae, is a very small passerine bird in the kinglet family.  It is restricted to the western Canary Islands of La Palma and El Hierro where it is a non-migratory resident.

Previously thought to be the same taxon as the Tenerife Goldcrest Regulus regulus teneriffae, it was separated as a distinct subspecies of the goldcrest which apparently evolved from an independent colonisation of the islands 1.3–1.8 million years ago.

References

Regulus (bird)
Birds of the Canary Islands
Birds described in 2006